Gibeah (Gīḇəʿā;  Gīḇəʿaṯ) is the name of three places mentioned in the Hebrew Bible, in the tribes of Benjamin, Judah, and Ephraim respectively.

Gibeah of Benjamin is the most commonly mentioned of the places. In the Book of Judges, it is the main setting to the story of the Benjaminite War. Later, in the Book of Samuel, it is mentioned as the first capital of the united Kingdom of Israel under king Saul. Gibeah of Benjamin is generally identified with Tell el-Fūl in northern Jerusalem.<ref>{{cite book |last=Aharoni|first=Y. |author-link=Yohanan Aharoni |title=The Land of the Bible: A Historical Geography|edition=2 |publisher=Westminster Press |location=Philadelphia|year=1979|page=435 |language=en|isbn=0664242669 |oclc=6250553}} (original Hebrew edition: 'Land of Israel in Biblical Times - Historical Geography', Bialik Institute, Jerusalem (1962))</ref> 

Etymology
Gibeah is a Hebrew word meaning "hill".
                  

Gibeah of Benjamin

 Biblical narrative 
Gibeah in the tribe of Benjamin was the location of the infamous rape and murder of the Levite's concubine, and the resulting Battle of Gibeah. Israel’s first king, King Saul, reigned here for 22 years. According to PEF explorer C.R. Conder, the name may have applied to a district as well as to a town, since the neighboring town of Ramah is said to have been "in Gibeah."

It is mentioned several times in later prophetic writings. Also known as Gibeat. The name "Gibeah of God" (Give'at-elohim) may also refer to this Gibeah.

Perhaps to avoid confusion with other places named Gibeah, this location is also called "Gibeah of Benjamin" (Give'at Binyamin) and "Gibeah of Saul" (Give'at Sha'ul). The latter name is also used by the modern neighborhood Givat Shaul, which however is located in a different location.

 In extra-biblical sources 
According to Josephus, the 10th Roman Legion camped near Gabaothsaul in its assault on Jerusalem in 70 CE.

Identification with Tell el-Ful
According to Josephus, Gabaothsaul was located about 30 stadia north of Jerusalem, which would have roughly corresponded with the location of Tell el-Fūl.

King Hussein of Jordan began construction on his royal palace at Tell el-Ful, but construction was halted when the Six-Day War broke out. Since Israel won the war, King Hussein's palace was never finished and now all that remains is the skeleton of the building.Alternatively, Gibeah may have been where Jaba' now stands ( north of Jerusalem), a view held by biblical scholar Edward Robinson and C. Umhau Wolf. However, Jaba is now widely identified with the biblical city of GebaConder and Kitchener, 1883, SWP III, p. 9 
Israel Finkelstein also challenged the identification with Tell el-Fūl.

 Archaeology 
Tell el-Ful was first excavated in 1868 by Charles Warren, while C.R. Conder described the remains in 1874. William F. Albright led his first excavation from 1922 to 1923, and returned for a second season in 1923. His work was published in 1960. P.W. Lapp conducted a six-week salvage excavation in 1964. According to Kenneth Kitchen, "Upon this strategic point was found an Iron I occupation replaced (at an interval) by a fortress ("I"), subsequently refurbished ("II"), and then later in disuse. The excavations by Albright, checked by Lapp, would favor the view that it was Saul who built the first fortress, later repaired by him or David. The first fort (quadrangular) had at least one rectangular corner-tower at its southwest angle; it may have had others at the other corners, but no traces were detected."

The site was once more inhabited around the start of the Hellenistic period, and its wall was once more in service. The citadel underwent repairs as well in the second century BCE. At the end of the second century BCE, the site was abandoned.

Gibeah of Judah and Ephraim

Gibeah of Judah was a city in the tribal inheritance of Judah; cities mentioned in nearby verses included Zanoah and Halhul. C. R. Conder identifies this Gibeah with Jab'a.

Gibeah of Ephraim was a city in the tribal inheritance of Ephraim, "the Gibeah of Phinehas"; Eleazar, the son of Aaron, was buried here. Possibly Awarta.

See also
History of Ancient Israel and Judah

References

Further reading
 Albright, W.F. (1971). The Archaeology of Palestine 
 Arnold, P. (1992). "Gibeah", Anchor Bible Dictionary 
 Lapp, N. (1997). "Tell el-Ful", Oxford Encyclopedia of Archaeology in the Near East 
 
 Sinclair, L.A. (1960). An Archaeological Study of Gibeah''

1868 archaeological discoveries
Hebrew Bible mountains
Tells (archaeology)
Kingdom of Israel (united monarchy)
Disputed Biblical places
Tribe of Benjamin
East Jerusalem